The Baptist Union of Uganda is a Baptist Christian denomination in Uganda. It is affiliated with the Baptist World Alliance. The headquarters is in Kampala.

History
The Baptist Union of Uganda has its origins in an American mission of the International Mission Board in 1963.  It is officially founded in 1974.  According to a denomination census released in 2020, it claimed 1,800 churches and 550,000 members.

See also 
 Bible
 Born again
 Baptist beliefs
 Worship service (evangelicalism)
 Jesus Christ
 Believers' Church

References

External links
 Official Website

Baptist denominations in Africa
Evangelicalism in Uganda